Loybas Hill (formerly Squaw Hill) is an unincorporated community in Tehama County, in the U.S. state of California.

History
The name Loybas Hill was proposed by the Paskenta Band of Nomlaki Indians, and honors the past, present and future Native women from and living in the area. Loybas translates to "Young Lady." The name was changed in 2023 after review by the Board on Geographic Names, part of the Department of the Interior.

According to tradition, the communities former name was in honor of a pair of elderly Native American women ("squaws") who remained at the site after their tribe was driven out.

References

Unincorporated communities in Tehama County, California